Shellshock 2: Blood Trails is a first-person shooter video game developed by Rebellion Developments and published by Eidos Interactive for Microsoft Windows, PlayStation 3 and Xbox 360. It is a sequel to Shellshock: Nam '67. It received poor reviews from critics.

Plot
The plot revolves around a special operations team led by Sergeant Caleb "Cal" Walker, who vanished after being sent into the jungles of Cambodia to retrieve a mysterious cargo known as Whiteknight, which was lost after a U.S. transport plane was shot down by a North Vietnamese Air Force jet. Cal lost his men to the earliest victims of Whiteknight, the downed U.S. plane crew. Cal was infected with the virus that he meant to secure.

One month after the event, Cal comes out of the jungle alone, only to be captured and brought to a U.S. base in the Pleiku Highlands. Cal's newly drafted younger brother, Private Nathaniel "Nate" Walker was brought by Sgt. Jack Griffin to the base in order to extract info regarding Whiteknight from his deranged brother. Unfortunately, Cal was able to escape after killing some soldiers during a Viet Cong attack on Pleiku. The joint Viet Cong-North Vietnamese Army attack was orchestrated by Nguyen Van Trang, a VC officer sent to capture Cal.

Nate, with help of Griffin, and GIs that he met along the way, must hunt down Cal, moving from Pleiku to an old temple in Cambodia. Nate is also tasked to stop Nguyen Trang and his comrades from capturing Cal. Nate, through the course of his journey, combats those infected with Whiteknight, the VC, and NVA.

Reception

Shellshock 2: Blood Trails received "generally unfavorable" reviews, according to review aggregator Metacritic.

Ban in Australia
On June 23, 2008, Shellshock 2: Blood Trails was refused classification by the Australian Classification Board, because of violence which was deemed too strong to be accommodated within the MA 15+ classification which was the highest rating video games could be given at the time. The game's distributor decided not to appeal the ban.

References

External links

2009 video games
Alternate history video games
Anti-war video games
Eidos Interactive games
First-person shooters
Games for Windows certified games
PlayStation 3 games
Rebellion Developments games
Video games about viral outbreaks
Video games about zombies
Video games set in Cambodia
Video games set in Vietnam
Vietnam War video games
Windows games
Xbox 360 games
Video games developed in the United Kingdom